This is a list of frigate classes of the Royal Navy of the United Kingdom (and the individual ships composed within those classes) in chronological order from the formal creation of the Royal Navy following the Restoration in 1660. Where the word 'class' or 'group' is not shown, the vessel was a 'one-off' design with just that vessel completed to the design. The list excludes vessels captured from other navies and added to the Royal Navy.

All frigates built for the Royal Navy up to 1877 (when the Admiralty re-categorised all frigates and corvettes as "cruisers") are listed below. The term "frigate" was resuscitated in World War II and subsequent classes are listed at the end of this article, but the individual ships within those classes are not listed in this article.

The frigate before 1660

The initial meaning of frigate in English/British naval service was a fast sailing warship, usually with a relatively low superstructure and a high length:breadth ratio—as distinct from the heavily armed but slow "great ships" with high fore- and after-castles. The name originated at the end of the 16th century, the first "frigats" being generally small, fast-sailing craft, in particular those employed by Flemish privateers based on Dunkirk and Flushing. Subsequently, the term was applied to any vessel with these characteristics, even to a third-rate or fourth-rate ship of the line.

As the Royal Navy was not officially created until 1660, vessels from the preceding (Commonwealth) era are only included where they survived past 1660. Prizes taken from enemy naval forces and added to the Royal Navy are also excluded.

Fifth-rates before 1660

Prior to 1626 when the rating system was established, these vessels were known as pinnaces. The vessels were considered too lightly armed and built to stand in the line of battle. Fifth rates were essentially two-decked vessels, with a demi-battery on the lower deck and a lesser number of guns of lesser power on the upper deck (as well as even smaller guns on the quarter deck).
 1651 Programme Group
Pearl

Primrose
Nightingale

 Vessels of 1653–1656 Programmes:
  – launched 23 February 1654
 Islip – launched 25 March 1654 (wrecked 24 July 1655)
 Fagons – launched 22 May 1654, renamed HMS Milford in 1660
 Selby – launched 22 April 1654, renamed HMS Eagle in 1660
 Basing – launched 26 April 1654, renamed HMS Guernsey in 1660
 Grantham – launched 1654, renamed HMS Garland in 1660
  – launched 11 September 1655
  – launched September 1655
  – launched 22 September 1655
 Cheriton – launched 16 April 1656, renamed HMS Speedwell in 1660
 Wakefield – launched November 1656, renamed HMS Richmond in 1660
  – launched November 1656
  – launched 3 September 1657
 Bradford – launched March 1658, renamed HMS Success in 1660

Sixth-rate frigates before 1660

Sixth rates were single-decked vessels, with a battery on the (single) gun deck, and usually some lesser guns on the quarter deck.
 Vessels of 1651 Programme:
 Drake – launched 1652
  – launched 1652
  – launched 1652

Frigates from 1660 to 1688

Fifth-rate frigates from 1660 to 1688
Charles Galley was an early galley-frigate with a bank of sweeps above the waterline, the last of these types (Royal Anne Galley) being launched in 1709.

 Vessels of 1665 Programme:
  – launched 1665
  – launched 21 March 1666
  – launched 1666
Vessels of 1668–1669 Programmes:
  – launched 22 December 1668
  – launched 31 March 1671
 Vessels of 1670s construction:
  – launched September 1674
  – launched 29 June 1675
  – 32 guns, launched 1676, rebuilt 1693, renamed HMS Torrington in 1729 after two further rebuilds

Sixth-rate frigates from 1660 to 1688
 Designed and built by Anthony Deane at Harwich
  – launched July 1666
  – launched 24 July 1666
  – launched 1666
 Designed and built by Anthony Deane at Portsmouth
  – launched 28 October 1669
  – launched July 1672
 Designed and built by Sir Anthony Deane at Blackwall
  – launched 11 June 1675

Fifth rates from 1688 to 1719

For ships before the 1745 Establishment, the term 'class' is inappropriate as individual design was left up to the master shipwright in each Royal dockyard. For other vessels, the Surveyor of the Navy produced a common design for ships which were to be built under a commercial contract rather than in a Royal Dockyard. Consequently, the term 'group' is used as more applicable for ships built to similar specifications (and to the same principal dimensions) but to varying designs.

Fifth rates from 1688 to 1719

1689 Programme Group – 32-gun fifth rates 1689–1691

 ex-fourth rate rebuilt 1691 as a fifth rate – 40 guns
 purchased 1693 – 40 guns.
HMS Charles Galley – 32 guns, launched 1676, rebuilt 1693, renamed Torrington in 1727 after two more rebuilds 
1693 Programme Group – 32-gun fifth rates 1694
HMS Shoreham 1694
HMS Scarborough 1694
HMS Sorlings 1694
HMS Winchelsea 1694
1694 Programme Group – 32-gun fifth rates 1695–1698
HMS Lyme 1695
HMS Hastings (i) 1695
HMS Milford 1695
HMS Arundel 1695
HMS Rye 1696
HMS Scarborough 1696
HMS Looe (i) 1696
HMS Lynn 1696
HMS Fowey 1696
HMS Southsea Castle (i) 1696
HMS Gosport 1696
HMS Poole 1696
HMS Feversham 1696
HMS Hastings (ii) 1698
HMS Lowestoffe 1697
HMS Looe (ii) 1697
HMS Southsea Castle (ii) 1697
HMS Bridgewater 1698
HMS Ludlow 1698
 - purchased 1695 - 36 guns
 - only ship of Royal Navy built at Kinsale, Ireland
Tartar Group 1702-1703
HMS Tartar 1702
HMS Falcon 1704
HMS Fowey 1705
Lark group – 42-gun fifth rates 1703–1706
HMS Hector 1703
HMS Lark 1703
HMS Greyhound 1703
HMS Garland 1703
HMS Folkestone 1703
HMS Roebuck 1704 (40 guns only)
HMS Sorlings 1706
1706 Establishment group – 42-gun fifth rates 1707–1715
The Navy Board ordered sixteen of these vessels between 1705 and 1711 as 42-gun vessels. The remaining pair—Looe and Diamond—were not ordered but rather the Navy Board purchased them on the stocks from the shipbuilder who had commenced building them "on spec". All the vessels were armed under the 1703 Guns Establishment with a main battery of nine-pounder guns. Under the 1716 Guns Establishment, a 40-gun ship with a main battery of 12-pounder guns superseded the 42-gun ship. Hence, the last six of the ships listed below were completed as 40-gun ships.
HMS Ludlow Castle 1707 – broken up 1721
HMS Gosport 1707 – broken up 1735
HMS Portsmouth 1707 – broken up 1728
HMS Hastings 1707 – sold for breaking 1745
HMS Looe 1707 – sunk as a breakwater 1737
HMS Diamond 1708 – broken up 1721 to rebuild
HMS Sapphire 1708 – sold for breaking 1745
HMS Enterprize 1709 – sold for breaking 1749
HMS Pearl 1708 – broken up 1723 to rebuild
HMS Southsea Castle 1708 – broken up 1723 to rebuild
HMS Adventure 1709 – broken up 1724 to rebuild
HMS Mary Galley 1708 – broken up 1721 to rebuild
HMS Fowey 1709 – renamed Queenborough 1744, sold for breaking 1746
HMS Royal Anne Galley 1709 – wrecked 1721
HMS Charles Galley – launched 1676, rebuilt 1693 and 1710 – renamed Torrington 1729, broken up 1744
HMS Launceston 1711 – broken up 1726 to rebuild
HMS Faversham 1712 – broken up 1730 to rebuild
HMS Lynn 1715 – broken up 1732

Sixth-rate frigates from 1688 to 1719

Before the "true" sail frigate came into being in the 1740s, the equivalent was the single-deck cruising vessel of the sixth rate, armed with either 20, 22 or 24 guns, which established itself in the 1690s and lasted until the arrival of the new "true" frigates. Before 1714, many small sixth rates carried fewer than 20 guns, and these have been excluded from this list. For over half a century from the 1690s, the main armament of this type was the 6-pounder gun, until it was replaced by nine-pounder guns just prior to being superseded by the 28-gun sixth-rate frigate.
Maidstone Group 24-gun sixth rates 1693–1697
HMS Maidstone 1693
HMS Jersey 1694
HMS Lizard (i) 1694
HMS Newport 1694
HMS Falcon 1694
HMS Queenborough 1694
HMS Swan 1694
HMS Drake 1694
HMS Solebay 1694
HMS Seahorse 1694
HMS Bideford 1695
HMS Penzance 1695
HMS Dunwich 1695
 1695
HMS Lizard (ii) 1697
HMS Flamborough 1697
HMS Seaford 1697
HMS Deal Castle 1697
HMS Seaford 24-gun sixth rate purchased 1695
HMS Peregrine Galley 20-gun sixth rate 1700
Nightingale group 24-gun sixth rates 1702–1704
HMS Nightingale 1702
HMS Squirrel (i) 1703
HMS Squirrel (ii) 1704
Aldborough group 24-gun sixth rates purchased 1706
HMS Aldborough 1706
HMS Nightingale 1707
HMS Deal Castle 1706
Flamborough group 24-gun sixth rates 1707
HMS Flamborough 1707
HMS Squirrel 1707
Gibraltar group 20-gun sixth rates 1711–1716
HMS Solebay 1711
HMS Gibraltar 1711
HMS Port Mahon 1711
HMS Blandford 1711
HMS Hind 1712
HMS Seahorse 1712
HMS Rose 1712
HMS Bideford 1712
HMS Success 1712
HMS Greyhound 1712
HMS Lively 1713
HMS Speedwell 1716
HMS Dursley Galley 20-gun sixth rate 1719

Frigates from 1719 to 1750
For ships before the 1745 Establishment, the term 'class' is inappropriate as individual design was left up to the master shipwright in each Royal dockyard. For other vessels, the Surveyor of the Navy produced a common design for ships which were to be built under a commercial contract rather than in a Royal Dockyard. Consequently, the term 'group' is used as more applicable for ships built to similar specifications laid down in the Establishments but to varying designs. However, from 1739 almost all fifth and sixth rates were built under contract and were thus to a common class.

Fifth-rate frigates from 1719 to 1750
 1719 Establishment 40-gun fifth rates 1721–1733
All thirteen were rebuilds of earlier 40-gun ships (Torrington and Princess Louisa were renamed when rebuilt from the former Charles Galley—first launched in 1679—and Launceston respectively), although Anglesea and Adventure were authorised as 'Great Repairs' rather than as rebuildings.
  1721 – broken up 1742
  1723 – broken up 1744
  1724 – broken up 1749
  1724 – broken up 1744
  1725 – sunk as a breakwater 1742
  1725 – broken up 1741
  1726 – broken up 1741
  1726 – capsized 1744
  1726 – broken up 1744
  1727 – broken up 1744
  1728 – wrecked 1736
 Torrington 1729 – broken up 1744
  1733 – sunk as a breakwater 1743
 1733 Establishment 40-gun (later 44-gun) fifth rates 1736–1741
 Eltham (1736) – broken up 1763
 Dover (1741) – sold 1763
 Folkestone (1741) – sold 1749
 Faversham (1741) – sold 1749
 Lynn (1741) – sold 1763
 Gosport (1741) – broken up 1768
 Sapphire (1741) – razéed to 32-gun frigate 1756–58, sold 1784
 Hastings (1741) – broken up 1763
 Liverpool (1741) – sold 1763
 Kinsale (1741) – sold 1763
 Adventure (1741) – razéed to 32-gun frigate 1756–58, sold 1770
 Diamond (1741) – sold 1756
 Launceston (1741) – sold 1784
 Looe (1741) – wrecked 1744
 1741 Establishment 44-gun ships 1742–1747
 Anglesea (1742) – taken by the French 1745
 Torrington (1743) – sold 1763
 Hector (1743) – sold 1762
 Roebuck (1743) – lent as a privateer 1763, sold 1764
 Lark (1744) – sold 1757
 Pearl (1744) – sold 1759
 Mary Galley (1744) – used as breakwater 1764
 Ludlow Castle (1744) – razéed to 24-gun frigate 1762, broken up 1771
 Fowey (1744) – wrecked 1748
 Looe (1745) – hulked 1750
 Chesterfield (1745) – wrecked 1762
 Poole (1745) – broken up 1765
 Southsea Castle (1745) – converted to storeship 1760, lost 1762
 Prince Edward (1745) – sold 1766
 Anglesea (1746) – used as breakwater 1764
 Thetis (1747) – converted to hospital ship 1757, sold 1767
 1745 Establishment 44-gun ships 1747–1749
 Prince Henry (1747) – broken up 1764
 Assurance (1747) – wrecked 1753
 Expedition (1747) – broken up 1764
 Penzance (1747) – sold 1766
 Crown (1747) – converted to Storeship 1757, sold 1770
 Rainbow (1747) – fitted with an experimental all-carronade armament 1782, hulked 1784
 Humber (1748) – wrecked 1762
 Woolwich (1749) – sold 1762
 modified 1745 Establishment (lengthened by 6 ft)
 America (1749) – renamed Boston 1756, sold 1757

Sixth-rate frigates from 1719 to 1750

 1719 Establishment 20-gun sixth rates 1720–1728:
 HMS Lyme 1720
 HMS Greyhound 1720
 HMS Blandford 1720
 HMS Shoreham 1720
 HMS Scarborough 1722
 HMS Garland 1724
 HMS Seaford 1724
 HMS Lowestoffe 1723
 HMS Rose 1724
 HMS Deal Castle 1727
 HMS Fox 1727
 HMS Gibraltar 1727
 HMS Bideford 1727
 HMS Seahorse 1727
 HMS Squirrel 1727
 HMS Aldborough 1727
 HMS Flamborough 1727
 HMS Experiment 1727
 HMS Rye 1727
 HMS Phoenix 1728
 Modified 1719 Establishment 20-gun sixth rates 1732:
 HMS Sheerness 1732
 HMS Dolphin 1732
 1733 Establishment 20-gun sixth rates 1734–1742:
 HMS Tartar 1734
 HMS Kennington 1736
 HMS Fox 1740
 HMS Winchelsea 1740
 HMS Lyme 1740
 HMS Rye 1740
 HMS Experiment 1740
 HMS Lively 1740
 HMS Port Mahon 1740
 HMS Scarborough 1740
 HMS Success 1740
 HMS Rose 1740
 HMS Bideford 1740
 HMS Bridgewater 1740
 HMS Seaford 1741
 HMS Solebay 1742
 HMS Wager 28-gun sixth rate purchased 1739
 Modified 1733 Establishment 20-gun sixth rates 1741
 HMS Greyhound 1741
 HMS Blandford 1741
 1741 Establishment 20-gun sixth rates 1742–1746:
 HMS Lowestoffe 1742
 HMS Aldborough 1743
 HMS Alderney 1743
 HMS Phoenix 1743
 HMS Sheerness 1743
 HMS Wager 1744
 HMS Shoreham 1744
 HMS Bridgewater 1744
 HMS Glasgow 1745
 HMS Triton 1745
 HMS Mercury 1745
 HMS Surprise 1746
 HMS Siren 1745
 HMS Fox 1746
 HMS Rye 1746
Modified 1741 Establishment 20-gun sixth rates 1746.
 HMS Centaur 1746
 HMS Deal Castle 1746
 HMS Nightingale 22-gun sixth rate 1746
 HMS Garland 20-gun sixth rate 1748
 1745 Establishment 24-gun sixth rates 1746–1751, armed with two nine-pounder canons on the lower deck and 20 on the upper deck, two three-pounders on the quarterdeck 
 HMS Arundel 1746 – sold 1765
 HMS Queenborough 1747 – driven ashore on the Indian coast near Pondicherry by a hurricane on New Year's Day 1761
 HMS Fowey 1749 – sunk by shore batteries at Yorktown on 10.10.1781
 HMS Hind 1749 – sold 1784
 HMS Sphinx 1748 – sold 1770
 HMS Dolphin 1751 – broken up 1777
 Modified 1745 Establishment 24-gun sixth rate 1748, armed as the ships above
 HMS Boston 1748 – broken up 1752
 HMS Seahorse 24-gun sixth rate, designed by Jacob Acworth, 1748, armed with two nine-pounder canons on the lower deck and 22 on the upper deck, two three-pounders on the quarterdeck – sold 1784
 HMS Mermaid 24-gun sixth rate, designed by Joseph Allin, 1749, armed with 20 nine-pounder canons on the upper deck and four three-pounders on the quarterdeck – wrecked off the Coast of South Carolina on 06.01.1760
  28-gun sixth rates 1748
Two nominally 24-gun ships – the Lyme and Unicorn – were built in 1747–1749 with 24 nine-pounders on the upper deck but also carried four smaller guns on the quarterdeck. There were no more guns on the lower deck that was lowered to the waterline; the pair were designated as 24-gun ships (disregarding the smaller guns) until 1756, when they were re-classed as 28-gun frigates. However other 24-gun and 20-gun ships continued to be built, with either 22- or 29-pounder guns on the upper deck.
HMS Lyme 1748 – wrecked in the Baltic off the Swedish Coast on 18.10.1760
HMS Unicorn 1748 – broken up 1771

44-gun fifth rates from 1750 – by class
Those fifth-rate ships were not frigates in a stricter sense, being two-deckers, but they were mostly used in the same way, e.g. convoy protection. In addition they were too small to sail in the line of battle. Thus they are listed here. In the middle of the 18th century, those ships had a more powerful armament than the frigates at that time (these were nine and 12-pounders equipped), that consisted of 18-pounders on the gun deck. Later in the century, with the advent of the 18-pounder frigate (the first British 18-pounder armed frigate, HMS Flora (36), was launched in 1780), those ships became obsolete and ceased to being built in 1787, when the last one, HMS Sheerness, was launched. Many continued to serve until after the end of the Napoleonic Wars, most of them as troop- or storeships.

 Phoenix 1759 – wrecked 1780
 Roebuck class 1774–83 (Thomas Slade)
 HMS Roebuck 1774 – hospital ship 1790, troopship 1799, floating battery 1803, broken up 1811
 HMS Romulus 1777 – taken by France 1781
 HMS Actaeon 1778 – hulked 1793
 HMS Janus 1778 – troopship 1789, wrecked 1800
 HMS Charon (I) 1778 – sunk 1781
 HMS Dolphin 1781 – hospital ship 1781, troopship 1800, storeship 1804, broken up 1817
 HMS Ulysses 1779 – sold 1816
 HMS Serapis (I) 1779 – taken by John Paul Jones' Bonhomme Richard 1779
 [[HMS Endymion (1779)|HMS Endymion]] 1779 – lost 1790
 HMS Assurance 1780 – troopship 1791, transport 1796, hulked 1799
 HMS Argo 1781 – troopship 1791, sold 1816
 HMS Diomede 1781 – lost 1795
 HMS Guardian 1784 – sold 1791
 HMS Mediator 1782 – storeship and renamed Camel 1788, broken up 1810
 HMS Regulus 1785 – troopship 1800, broken up 1816
 HMS Resistance 1782 – blown up 1798
 HMS Serapis (II) 1782 – storeship 1798, broken up 1819
 HMS Gladiator 1783 – hulked 1807
 HMS Experiment 1784 – troopship, 1793, hulked 1805
 HMS Charon (II) 1783 – hospital ship 1794, troopship 1800, broken up 1805
 Adventure class 1784–87 (William Hunt)
 HMS Adventure 1784 – troopship 1799, hulked 1801, broken up 1816
 HMS Chichester 1785 – troopship 1787, storeship 1794, sold 1810
 HMS Expedition 1784 – troopship 1798, hulked 1810, broken up 1817
 HMS Gorgon 1785 – storeship 1793, floating battery 1805, broken up 1817
 HMS Woolwich 1785 – troopship 1793, storeship 1798, troopship 1813, wrecked 1813
 HMS Severn 1786 – wrecked 1804
 HMS Dover 1786 – transport 1795, accidentally burnt and then broken up 1806
 HMS Sheerness 1787 – completed as troopship, wrecked 1805

Sail frigates from 1750 – by class

Following the success of the Lyme and Unicorn in 1748, the mid-century period saw the simultaneous introduction in 1756 both of sixth-rate frigates of 28 guns (with a main battery of 24 nine-pounder guns, plus four lesser guns mounted on the quarterdeck and/or forecastle) and of fifth-rate frigates of 32 or 36 guns (with a main battery of 26 12-pounder guns, plus six or ten lesser guns mounted on the quarterdeck and/or forecastle).

The American Revolution saw the emergence of new fifth rates of 36 or 38 guns which carried a main battery of 18-pounder guns, and were thus known as "heavy" frigates, while the French Revolutionary War brought about the introduction of a few 24-pounder gun armed frigates. In the 1830s, new types emerged with a main battery of 32-pounder guns.

9-pounder armed post ships
After 1750, the official Admiralty criteria for defining a frigate required a minimum battery of 28 carriage-mounted guns, including such guns which were mounted on the quarterdeck and forecastle. The Admiralty categorized the smaller sixth rates, of frigate-type construction, but carrying between 20 and 26 guns, as "post ships", but seagoing officers often referred to then as "frigates" even though this was not officially recognised. The post ships, generally of 20 or 24 guns, were in practice the continuation of the earlier sixth rates. The Napoleonic War era post ships were later re-armed with (many being completed with) 32-pounder carronades instead of nine-pounder guns; after 1817 most of the survivors (except the Conway class), were re-classified as sloops.
[[Gibraltar-class post ship|Gibraltar class]] 20 guns, 1754–56; built to the lines of the French privateer Tygre captured in 1747.
HMS Gibraltar 1754 – broken up 1773
HMS Biddeford 1756 – wrecked 1761
HMS Flamborough 1756 – sold 1772
HMS Aldborough 1756 – broken up 1772
HMS Kennington 1756 – broken up 1774
HMS Lively 1756 – captured by France 1778, recaptured 1781, sold 1784
HMS Mercury 1756 – wrecked 1777
HMS Scarborough 1756 – foundered 1780
[[Seaford-class post ship|Seaford class]] 20 guns, 1754–57; built to the lines of HM Yacht Royal Caroline of 1749.
HMS Seaford 1754 – sold 1784
HMS Rose 1757 – scuttled to block Savannah Bar 1779
HMS Glasgow 1757 – accidentally burned 1779
[[Squirrel-class post ship|Squirrel class]] 20 guns, 1755–56; like the Seaford class built to the lines of HMY Royal Caroline.
HMS Squirrel 1755 – sold 1783
HMS Deal Castle 1756 – lost off Puerto Rico in the Great West Indian Hurricane of 1780
[[Sphinx-class post ship|Sphinx class]] 20 guns 1775–81; designed by John Williams
HMS Sphinx 1775 – broken up 1811
HMS Camilla 1776 – hulked 1809, sold 1831
HMS Daphne 1776 – taken by France 1795, retaken 1797, sold 1802 
HMS Galatea 1776 – broken up 1783
HMS Ariadne 1776 – sold 1814
HMS Vestal 1777 – foundered off Newfoundland 1777
HMS Perseus 1776 – converted to bomb vessel 1798, broken up 1805
HMS Unicorn 1776 – captured by France 1780, recaptured 1781, broken up 1787
HMS Ariel 1777 – taken by French l'Amazone in 1779
HMS Narcissus 1781 – wrecked off New Providence 1796
Porcupine class 24 guns, 1777–81; designed by John Williams
HMS Porcupine 1777 – broken up 1805
HMS Pelican 1776 – wrecked in a hurricane near Jamaica 1781
HMS Eurydice 1781 – hulked as receiving ship 1814, broken up 1834
HMS Hyena 1778 – captured by the French 1793, retaken 1797, reclassed as 20-gun ship 1798, sold 1802
HMS Penelope 1778 – cast away or foundered in the West Indies in November 1779
HMS Amphitrite 1778 – wrecked off Livorno 1794
HMS Crocodile 1781 – wrecked on the Scilly Rocks off Prawle Point 1784
HMS Siren 1779 – wrecked near Beachy Head 1781
HMS Pandora 1779 – wrecked off the Coast of Queensland, Australia, in 1791 while carrying the surviving mutineers of HMS Bounty back to England for trial
HMS Champion 1779 – hulked as receiving ship 1809, sold 1816
HMS Myrmidon 22 guns 1781; built to the lines of Amazone a French privateer captured in 1745 – hulked 1798, broken up 1811
HMS Squirrel 24 guns 1785; designed by Edward Hunt – hulked as a receiving ship 1812, sold 1817
[[Banterer-class post ship|Banterer class]] 22 guns 1806–07; designed by William Rule
HMS Banterer 1807 – wrecked in the Saint Laurence Stream 1808
HMS Crocodile 1806 – broken up 1816
HMS Daphne 1806 – sold 1816; became merchantman and last listed in 1824
HMS Cossack 1806 – broken up 1816
HMS Cyane 1806 – taken by USS Constitution 1815
HMS Porcupine 1807 – sold 1816; became mercantile Windsor Castle and was broken up at Mauritius in 1826
[[Laurel-class post ship|Laurel class]] 22 guns 1806–12; designed by John Henslow
HMS Laurel 1806 – taken by France 1808, retaken and renamed Laurestinus 1810, wrecked in the Bahamas 1813
HMS Boreas 1806 – wrecked on the Guernsey coast 1807
HMS Comus 1806 – wrecked at Newfoundland 1816
HMS Garland 1807 – sold 1817
HMS Perseus 1812 – hulked as receiving ship 1816, broken up 1850
HMS Volage 1807 – sold 1818
[[Hermes-class post ship|Hermes class]] 20 guns 1811–16; flush-decked sixth rates based on the lines of the French corvette Bonne Citoyenne (1794) taken in 1796; only the last two of the class were given quarterdecks and forecastles in 1820–21, making them post ships
HMS Hermes 1811 – grounded and burnt by her crew near Mobile, Alabama, 1814
HMS Myrmidon 1813 – broken up 1823
HMS Ariadne 1816 – post ship (26 guns) 1820, hulked 1837, sold 1841 
HMS Valorous 1816 – post ship (26 guns) 1821, broken up 1829
[[Cyrus-class post ship|Cyrus class]] flush-decked 20-gun sixth rates 1813–14; the design was based on HMS Myrmidon of the Hermes class above, so can be considered a development of that class. Since none of the class possessed a quarterdeck or forecastle, they were actually not post ships
HMS Cyrus 1813 – sold 1823
HMS Medina 1813 – sold 1832
HMS Levant 1813 – captured by USS Constitution 1815, but was recaptured shortly afterwards; broken up 1820
HMS Esk 1813 – sold 1827
HMS Carron 1813 – wrecked near Puri, India 1820
HMS Tay 1813 – wrecked in the Gulf of Mexico 1816
HMS Slaney 1813 – 1830 hulked, broken up 1838
HMS Erne 1813 – lost 1819 lost
HMS Leven 1813 – hulked 1833, broken up 1848
HMS Falmouth 1814 – sold 1825
HMS Cyrene 1814 – sold 1828
HMS Bann 1814 – sold 1829
HMS Spey 1814 – sold 1822
HMS Lee 1814 – broken up 1822
HMS Hind 1814 – sold 1829
HMS Larne 1814 – sold 1820
[[Conway-class post ship|Conway class]] 26-gun sixth rates 1814–17 (later re-rated 28-gun); designed by William Rule 
HMS Conway 1814 – sold 1825
HMS Mersey 1814 – hulked as receiving ship 1831, broken up 1852
HMS Eden 1814 – broken up 1833
HMS Tamar 1814 – hulked as coal depot 1831, sold 1837
HMS Dee 1814 – sold 1819
HMS Towey 1814 – broken up 1822
HMS Menai 1814 – hulked as receiving ship 1829, target ship 1852, broken up 1853
HMS Tyne 1814 – sold 1825
HMS Wye 1814 – hulked as convict hospital ship 1834, broken up 1852
HMS Tees 1817 – hulked as church ship 1826, broken up 1872

9-pounder armed frigates

Although previously rated as 24-gun ships (when their four quarter-deck-mounted three-pounders were not included in the count), Unicorn and Lyme were redefined as 28-gun frigates from 1756. The Lowestoffe and Coventry-class frigates which followed were virtual copies of them, with slight improvements in design. Further 28-gun sixth rates, similarly armed with a main battery of 24 nine-pounder guns (and with four smaller carriage guns on the quarterdeck) continued to be built to evolving designs until the 1780s.
[[Lowestoffe-class frigate|Lowestoffe class]] 28-gun sixth rates 1756; designed by Thomas Slade based on the Lyme class of 1748
HMS Lowestoffe 1756 – wrecked in the Saint Lawrence River 1760
HMS Tartar 1756 – wrecked at San Domingo (Haiti) 1797
[[Coventry-class frigate|Coventry class]] 28-gun sixth rates 1757–85; designed by Thomas Slade based on Tartar of the Lowestoffe class above, so a further modification of the Lyme class
HMS Coventry 1757 – taken by the French in the Bay of Bengal 1783
HMS Lizard 1757 – hulked as hospital ship at Sheerness 1800, sold 1828 
HMS Liverpool 1758 – wrecked on Long Island 1778
HMS Maidstone 1758 – broken up 1794
HMS Active 1758 – taken by the French off San Domingo 1778
HMS Levant 1758 – broken up 1780
HMS Cerberus 1758 – abandoned and burnt at Rhode Island 1778
HMS Aquilon 1758 – sold 1776
HMS Griffin 1758 – wrecked on the shoals off Barbuda 1761
HMS Argo 1758 – broken up 1776
HMS Milford 1759 – sold 1785
HMS Guadeloupe 1763 – scuttled at Yorktown to prevent capture 1781.
HMS Carysfort 1766 – sold 1813
fir built Coventry class – due to the nature of the pine wood (fir or pine cannot be bent in tight angles), the design had to be fitted with a square tuck (i.e. flat) stern.
HMS Boreas 1757 – sold 1770.
HMS Hussar 1757 – stranded on the south coast of Cuba and taken by France 1762.
HMS Shannon 1757 – broken up 1765.
HMS Trent 1757 – sold 1764
HMS Actaeon 1757 – sold 1766
modified Coventry class slightly modified (8½ inch greater width) revival of the Coventry design
HMS Hind 1785 – broken up 1811
HMS Laurel – cancelled 1783
[[Mermaid-class frigate|Mermaid class]] 28-gun sixth rates 1761–63; design by Thomas Slade, adapted from the lines of the French Abénakise, captured 1757
HMS Mermaid 1761 – driven ashore and wrecked by a French squadron in Delaware Bay 1778
HMS Hussar 1763 – wrecked at Hell Gate of the East River 1780
HMS Solebay 1763 – run ashore and burned off Nevis to avoid capture in 1782
modified Mermaid class (keel lengthened by 8 5/8-inch) 1773–74
HMS Greyhound 1773 – wrecked on the South Sand near Deal in 1781
HMS Triton 1773 – broken up 1796
HMS Boreas 1774 – hulked as slop ship at Sheerness 1797, sold 1802
[[Enterprise-class frigate|Enterprize class]] 28-gun sixth rates 1773–87; 27 ships, designed by John Williams
HMS Siren 1773 – wrecked on the coast of Connecticut 1777
HMS Fox 1773 – taken by USS Hancock 1777, retaken by HMS Flora a month later, but then taken by the French Junon off Brest in 1778
HMS Enterprize 1774 – hulked as receiving ship at the Tower of London 1791, broken up 1807
HMS Surprise 1774 – sold 1783
HMS Actaeon 1775 – grounded at Charleston and burnt to avoid capture on 28 June 1776
HMS Proserpine 1777 – wrecked off Heligoland in 1799
HMS Andromeda 1777 – capsized in the Great West Indian Hurricane of 1780
HMS Aurora 1777 – sold 1814
HMS Medea 1778 – hulked as a hospital ship at Portsmouth in 1801 and sold 1805
HMS Pomona 1778 – renamed Amphitrite in 1795, broken up 1811
HMS Resource 1778 – converted to troopship in 1799, hulked as receiving ship at the Tower of London and renamed Enterprize in 1803, broken up 1816
HMS Sibyl 1779 – renamed Garland in 1795, lost off Madagascar on 26 July 1798
HMS Brilliant 1779 – broken up 1811
HMS Crescent 1779 – captured by the French frigates Gloire (1778) and Friponne (1780) on 20 June 1781
HMS Mercury 1779 – used as floating battery since 1803, converted to troopship in 1810, broken up 1814 
HMS Pegasus 1779 – converted to troopship in 1800, hulked as receiving ship in 1814, sold 1816
HMS Cyclops 1779 – converted to troopship in 1800, hulked as receiving ship at Portsmouth in 1807, sold 1814
HMS Vestal 1779 – converted to troopship in 1800, on lease to Trinity House from 1803 to 1810, hulked as prison ship at Barbados in 1814, sold 1816
HMS Laurel 1779 – driven ashore and disintegrated during the Great West Indian Hurricane of 1780
HMS Nemesis 1780 – taken by the French in 1795, retaken in 1796, converted to troopship in 1812, sold 1814
HMS Thisbe 1783 – converted to troopship in 1800, sold 1815
HMS Rose 1783 – wrecked on Rocky Point, Jamaica, on 28 June 1794
HMS Hussar 1784 – wrecked near Île Bas on 24 December 1796
HMS Dido 1784 – converted to troopship in 1800, hulked as Army prison ship at Portsmouth in 1804, sold 1817
HMS Circe 1785 – wrecked near Yarmouth on 6 November 1803
HMS Lapwing 1785 – hulked as salvage ship at Cork in 1810, residential ship at Pembroke from 1813, broken up 1828 
HMS Alligator 1787 – hulked as salvage ship at Cork in 1810, sold 1814

12-pounder armed frigates
Almost all of the following were of the 32-gun type (armed with 26 12-pounder guns on the upper deck and six smaller guns on the quarter deck and forecastle); one class (the Venus class of 1757–58) had 36 guns (with 26 12-pounder guns on the upper deck and 10 smaller guns on the quarter deck and forecastle)
[[Venus class frigate|Venus class]] 36-gun fifth rates 1757–58; designed by Thomas Slade
HMS Venus 1758 – reclassed as a 32 in 1792, renamed Heroine in 1809, hulked as convict ship in 1824, sold 1828.
HMS Pallas 1757 – ran aground on Saint George's Isle and sank 1783 
HMS Brilliant 1757 – sold 1776
[[Southampton class frigate|Southampton class]] 32-gun fifth rates 1757–59; designed by Thomas Slade
HMS Southampton 1757 – wrecked in the Bahamas off Conception Island on 27 November 1812
HMS Minerva 1759 – taken by the French frigate Concorde in 1778, retaken by HMS Courageux in 1781
HMS Vestal 1757 – broken up 1775
HMS Diana 1757 – sold 1793
[[Richmond-class frigate|Richmond class]] 32-gun fifth rates 1757–58 (batch 1), 1762–63 (batch 2); designed by William Bately
HMS Richmond 1757 – taken by the French in the Chesapeake in 1781
HMS Juno 1757 – abandoned and burnt at Rhode Island to prevent capture in 1778
HMS Thames 1758 – taken by the French frigate Carmagnole (1793) near Gibraltar in 1793, retaken by HMS Santa Margarita in 1796, broken up 1803 
HMS Lark 1762 – abandoned and burnt at Rhode Island together with HMS Juno
HMS Boston 1762 – broken up 1811
HMS Jason 1763 – sold 1785
[[Alarm class frigate|Alarm class]] 32-gun fifth rates 1758–66; designed by Thomas Slade
HMS Alarm 1758 – broken up 1812
HMS Eolus (or Aeolus) 1758 – hulked as receiving ship at Sheerness in 1796, renamed Guernsey in 1800, broken up 1801
HMS Stag 1758 – broken up 1783
HMS Pearl 1762 – hulked as a slop ship at Portsmouth in 1803, renamed Prothee in 1825, sold 1832
HMS Glory 1763 – renamed Apollo in 1774, broken up 1786
HMS Emerald 1762 – broken up 1793. (According to Rif Winfield – British Warships in The Age of Sail 1714– 1792. This is a "Niger Class" ship)
HMS Aurora 1766 – lost with all hands on her way to the West Indies in 1769
[[Niger class frigate|Niger class]] 32-gun fifth rates 1759–64; Thomas Slade design, "very similar" to the Alarm class above
HMS Niger 1759 – converted to troopship in 1799, reclassed as a 28-gun sixth rate in 1804, sold 1814
HMS Montreal 1761 – taken by the French off Málaga on 29 April 1779
HMS Quebec 1760 – caught fire and blew up while in action with the French frigate Surveillante (1778) on 5 October 1779
HMS Winchelsea 1764 – converted to troopship in 1800, mooring hulk at Sheerness in 1803, sold 1814
HMS Tweed 32-gun fifth rate 1759; one off design by Sir Thomas Slade, to the lengthened lines of the Tartar (28 guns) of Lowestoffe class (nine-pounder armed) above and built to lighter scantlings according to the French practice, sold 1776
[[Modified Lowestoffe class frigate|Lowestoffe class]] 32-gun fifth rates 1761–74; Thomas Slade design, like Mermaid class (nine-pounder armed) above, adapted from the French Frigate Abénakise, captured in 1757
HMS Lowestoffe 32-gun fifth rate 1761 – wrecked off Ingua on 10 August 1801
HMS Orpheus 1773 – abandoned and burnt at Rhode Island to prevent capture together with HMS Lark and Juno on 5 August 1778
HMS Diamond 1774 – sold 1784
[[Amazon class frigate (1773)|Amazon (Thetis) class]] 32-gun fifth rates 1773–87; 18 ships, designed by John Williams.
HMS Thetis 1773 – ran onto a rock and sank near Saint Lucia on 12 May 1781.
HMS Amazon 1773 – broken up 1794
HMS Ambuscade 1773 – taken by the French corvette Bayonnaise in 1798, retaken by HMS Victory in 1803 – broken up 1810
HMS Cleopatra 1779 – broken up 1814
HMS Amphion 1780 – accidentally caught fire and blew up at Portsmouth on 22 September 1796
HMS Orpheus 1780 – wrecked on a coral reef in the West Indies on 23 January 1807
HMS Juno 1780 – broken up 1811
HMS Success 1781 – taken by the French in the Mediterranean on 13 February 1801, retaken seven months later by HMS Pomone on 2 September, converted to troopship in 1812, hulked as prison ship at Halifax in 1813, broken up 1820
HMS Iphigenia 1780 – hulked as prison hospital ship at Plymouth in 1798, converted to troopship in 1801, accidentally burnt in the same year
HMS Andromache 1781 – broken up 1811
HMS Syren (or Siren) 1782 – hulked as lazaretto at Pembroke in 1805, broken up 1822
HMS Iris 1783 – on lease to Trinity House between 1803 and 1805, hulked as receiving ship at Yarmouth in 1811, presented to the Marine Society as a training ship, broken up 1833
HMS Greyhound 1783 – wrecked in the Philippines on 4 October 1808
HMS Meleager 1785  – wrecked on Triangle Bank in the Gulf of Mexico on 9 June 1801
HMS Castor 1785 – sold 1819
HMS Solebay 1785 – on lease to Trinity House from 1803 to 1806, wrecked in action with a Senegalese fort on 11 June 1809
HMS Terpsichore 1785 – hulked as receiving ship at Chatham in 1811, broken up 1813
HMS Blonde 1787 – hulked for stationary service at Portsmouth in 1803, sold 1805
[[Active-class frigate|Active class]] 32-gun fifth rates 1779–84; designed by Edward Hunt
HMS Active 1780 – wrecked in the Saint Lawrence River on 15 July 1796
HMS Daedalus 1780 – on lease to Trinity House from 1803 to 1806, broken up 1811
HMS Mermaid 1784 – converted to troopship in 1811, broken up 1815
HMS Cerberus 1779 – wrecked near Bermuda on 30 April 1783
HMS Fox 1780 – converted to troopship in 1812, broken up 1816
HMS Astraea (or Astrea) 1781 – fitted as troopship between 1800 and 1805, wrecked on rocks off Anegada on 24 May 1808
HMS Ceres 1781 – hulked as receiving ship at Sheerness in 1803, transferred to Chatham as harbour flagship in 1812, converted into a victualling depot in 1816 and broken up 1830
HMS Quebec 1781 – temporarily hulked at Woolwich between 1803 and 1805, hulked as receiving ship at Sheerness in 1813, broken up 1816
[[Hermione-class frigate (Royal Navy)|Andromeda or Hermione class]] 32-gun fifth rates 1782–86; designed by Edward Hunt
HMS Andromeda 1784 – broken up 1811
HMS Hermione 1782 – seized by mutineers on 22 September 1797, given to the Spanish garrison at La Guaira, cut out of the harbour and retaken on 25 October 1799, renamed Retaliation shortly after, renamed Retribution in 1800, presented to Trinity House in 1803 
HMS Druid 1783 – fitted as troopship from 1798 to 1805, broken up 1813
HMS Penelope 1783 – broken up 1797
HMS Aquilon 1786 – broken up 1816
HMS Blanche 1786 – wrecked in the entrance to the Texel
HMS Heroine 32-gun fifth rate 1783; purchased on the stocks from Adams of Bucklers Hard in 1782 – converted to troopship in 1800, hulked 1803
[[Maidstone-class frigate|Maidstone class]] 32-gun fifth rates 1795–96; designed by John Henslow, fir-built version of the Cerberus (or Alcmene) class of 18-pounder frigates of 1794
HMS Maidstone 1795 – broken up 1810
HMS Shannon 1796 – sold 1802
HMS Triton 32-gun fifth rate 1796; experimental "Admiralty" design by rear-admiral James Gambier, the Lord Commissioner of the Admiralty; fir-built, the ship was originally intended to carry 18-pounders but was considered too weak for the armament – hulked as receiving ship at Woolwich in 1803, transferred to Plymouth in 1810, sold 1814
[[Thames-class frigate|Thames class]] 32-gun fifth rates 1804–06; design modified from William Bately's Richmond class of 1757
HMS Circe 1804 – sold 1814
HMS Pallas 1804 – wrecked in the Firth of Forth on 18 December 1810
HMS Thames 1805 – converted to troopship in 1814, broken up 1816 
HMS Jason 1804 – broken up 1815
HMS Hebe 1804 – sold 1813
HMS Minerva 1805 – broken up 1816
HMS Alexandria 1806 – hulked as receiving ship at Sheerness in 1817, broken up 1818
HMS Medea – cancelled 1804

18-pounder armed frigates

In general, the following were either 36-gun type (armed with 26 18-pounder guns on the upper deck and 10 smaller guns on the quarter deck and forecastle) or 38-gun type (with 28 18-pounder guns on the upper deck and 10 smaller guns on the quarter-deck and forecastle); however, one class of smaller ships had just 32 guns (with 26 18-pounder guns on the upper deck and just six smaller guns on the quarter deck and forecastle)Flora class 36-gun fifth rates 1780, designed by John Williams
HMS Flora 1780 – wrecked and destroyed on the Dutch coast on 19 January 1808
HMS Thalia 1782 – broken up 1814
HMS Crescent 1784 – wrecked on the Coast of Jutland on 6 December 1808
HMS Romulus 1785 – converted to troopship in 1799, hulked as hospital ship at Bermuda in 1813, broken up 1816
[[Minerva-class frigate|Minerva class]] 38-gun fifth rates 1780–82, designed by Edward Hunt
HMS Minerva 1780 – broken up 1803
HMS Arethusa 1781 – broken up 1814
HMS Phaeton 1782 – Sold 1827
HMS Latona 38-gun fifth rate 1781, designed by John Williams – converted to troopship 1810, hulked as receiving ship at Leith 1813, sold 1816
HMS Thetis 38-Gun fifth rate 1782, designed by Edward Hunt, modified from the Minerva class above – used as troopship between 1800 and 1805, sold 1814
[[Perseverance-class frigate|Perseverance class]] 36-gun fifth rates 1781–83, designed by Edward Hunt
HMS Perseverance 1781 – hulked as receiving ship circa 1806, sold 1823
HMS Phoenix 1783 – wrecked near Smyrna on 20 February 1816
HMS Inconstant 1783 – used as troopship between 1798 and 1806, broken up 1817
HMS Leda 1783 – capsized in a squall and foundered off Madeira 11 December 1795 
HMS Melampus 36-gun fifth rate 1785, designed by Edward Hunt – sold to the Dutch Navy in 1815
HMS Beaulieu 40-gun fifth rate 1791 – purchased on the stocks in June 1790 from Adams of Bucklers Hard – broken up 1806
[[Pallas class frigate|Pallas class]] 32-gun fifth rates 1793–94; designed by John Henslow
HMS Pallas 1793 – wrecked on Mount Batten Point, Plymouth on 4 April 1798
HMS Stag 1794 – wrecked in Vigo Bay, Spain on 6 September 1800
HMS Unicorn 1794 – broken up 1815
[[Artois class frigate|Artois class]] 38-gun fifth rates 1794–97; designed by John Henslow
HMS Artois 1794 – wrecked near La Rochelle on 31 July 1797
HMS Diana 1794 – sold to the Dutch Navy in 1815
HMS Apollo 1794 – wrecked on the Haak Sands off the coast of Holland on 7 January 1799
HMS Diamond 1794 – broken up 1812
HMS Jason 1794 – wrecked near Brest on 13 October 1798
HMS Seahorse 1794 – broken up 1819
HMS Ethalion 1797 – wrecked on rocks off Penmarch, Brittany, on 19 December 1799
fir-built Artois class with alterations necessary for fir wood, notably the flat, square tuck stern
HMS Clyde (I) 1796 – taken to pieces for rebuilding in 1805
HMS Tamar (or Tamer) 1796 – broken up 1810
HMS Clyde (II) 1806 – rebuilt from the previous ship of that name, laid up in 1810, sold 1814
[[Alcmene class frigate|Cerberus (or Alcmene) class]] 32-gun fifth rates 1794, designed by John Henslow
HMS Cerberus 1794 – sold 1814
HMS Alcmene 1794 – wrecked off Nantes on 29 April 1809.
HMS Galatea 1794 – broken up 1809
HMS Lively 1794 – wrecked near Rota Point, Cadiz on 12 April 1798
[[Phoebe class frigate|Phoebe class]] 36-gun fifth rates 1795–1800, lengthened version of William Hunt's Perseverance class of 1780
HMS Phoebe 1795 – hulked as receiving ship at Plymouth 1826, sold 1841
HMS Dryad 1795 – hulked as receiving ship at Portsmouth 1838, broken up 1860
HMS Caroline 1795 – hulked as salvage vessel at Portsmouth 1813, broken up 1815
HMS Doris 1795 – wrecked in Quiberon Bay on 21 January 1805
HMS Fortunee 1800 – sold 1818
[[Amazon class frigate (1795)|Amazon class]] 36-gun fifth rates 1795–96, designed by William Rule
HMS Amazon 1795 – hit a sandbank and was abandoned three hours later during the action against the French 74-gun ship Droits de l'Homme in Audierne Bay, Brittany on 14 January 1797
HMS Emerald 1795 – hulked as receiving ship at Portsmouth in 1822, broken up 1836
fir-built Amazon class with alterations necessary for fir wood, notably the flat, square tuck stern
HMS Trent 1796 – hospital ship laid up at Cork in 1803, hulked 1815, broken up 1823
 1796 – in Ordinary at Plymouth in 1803 until sold for breaking up in 1814
HMS Naiad 38-gun fifth rate 1797, designed by William Rule – hulked as a coal depot at Callao, Peru in 1847, sold 1866
HMS Acasta 40-gun fifth rate 1797, designed by William Rule – broken up 1821
HMS Boadicea 38-gun fifth rate 1797, built to the lines of the French Impérieuse, taken in 1793 – broken up 1858
HMS Sirius 36-gun fifth rate 1797, built to the lines of the French Minerve, taken in 1794 and renamed San Fiorenzo – grounded at Mauritius and destroyed to prevent capture 1810
HMS Hydra 38-gun fifth rate 1797; built to the lines of the French Melpomène, captured in 1794, a sister ship to Minerve and Impérieuse above – converted to troopship 1813, sold 1820
[[Amazon class frigate (1799)|Amazon class]] 38-gun fifth rates 1799, designed by William Rule
HMS Amazon 1799 – broken up 1817
HMS Hussar 1799 – wrecked in the Bay of Biscay in February 1804
HMS Active 38-gun fifth rate 1799; designed by John Henslow – hulked as receiving ship 1825, renamed Argo 1833, broken up 1860.
[[Leda-class frigate|Leda class]] 38-gun fifth rates 1800–19, built to the lines of the French Hébé of 1782
HMS Leda 1800 – wrecked at the mouth of Milford Haven on 31 January 1808
HMS Pomone 1805 – wrecked on the Needles on 14 October 1811
HMS Shannon 1806 – hulked as receiving ship at Sheerness in 1831, renamed Saint Lawrence in 1844, broken up 1859
HMS Leonidas 1807 – hulked as powder hulk at Sheerness in 1872, sold 1894
HMS Briton 1812 – hulked as convict ship at Portsmouth in 1841, broken up 1860
HMS Surprise 1812 – hulked as convict ship at Cork in 1822, sold 1837
HMS Tenedos 1812 – hulked as convict ship at Bermuda in 1843, converted to accommodation ship in 1863, broken up 1875
HMS Lacedemonian 1812 – broken up 1822
HMS Lively 1813 – hulked as receiving ship 1831, sold 1863
HMS Diamond 1816 – accidentally burnt at Portsmouth on 18 April 1827
HMS Amphitrite 1816 – razeed to a 26-gun corvette, transferred to the Coast Guard in 1857
HMS Trincomalee 1817 – Teak built, cut down to a 26-gun corvette in 1847, hulked as training ship for volunteers at Sunderland in 1861, sold 1897 to Wheatley Cobb at Falmouth, became training ship Foudroyant, still afloat as museum ship under her original name at Hartlepool
HMS Thetis 1817 – wrecked off Cape Frio, Brazil, on 5 December 1830
HMS Arethusa 1817 – hulked as lazaretto at Liverpool in 1836, renamed Bacchus in 1844, transferred to Plymouth in 1850, and transformed to coal depot in 1852, sold for breaking in 1883
HMS Blanche 1819 – hulked as receiving ship at Portsmouth in 1833, sold for breaking in 1865
HMS Fisgard 1819 – hulked as harbour flagship at Woolwich in 1847, broken up 1879modified Leda class 46-gun fifth rates 1820–30
HMS Venus 1820 – hulked and lent to the Marine Society in 1848, broken up 1865
HMS Melampus 1820 – transferred to the Coastguard at Southampton in 1857, returned to the Navy at Portsmouth in 1866, used as an ordnance store for the War Office until 1891, sold 1906
HMS Minerva 1820 – broken up 1895
HMS Latona 1821 – hulked as mooring vessel at Sheerness in 1868, powder depot at Portsmouth in 1872, broken up 1875
HMS Nereus 1821 – hulked as coal depot at Valparaiso in 1843, sold 1879
HMS Diana 1822 – hulked as receiving ship at Sheerness in 1868, broken up 1874
HMS Hebe 1826 – hulked as receiving ship at Woolwich in 1839, transferred to Sheerness for breaking in 1872
HMS Hamadryad 1823 – hulked as hospital ship at Cardiff in 1866, sold 1905
HMS Amazon 1821 – cut down to a 26-gun corvette in 1845, sold 1863
HMS Aeolus (or Eolus) 1825 – hulked as stores depot at Sheerness in 1846, transferred to Portsmouth as accommodation ship in 1855, transformed into a lazaretto in 1761, broken up 1886
HMS Thisbe 1824 – hulked as floating church at Cardiff 1863, sold 1892
HMS Cerberus 1827 – broken up 1866
HMS Circe 1827 – hulked as accommodation ship 1866, swimming bath 1885, renamed Impregnable IV, sold for breaking in 1922
HMS Clyde 1827 – hulked as RNR training ship at Aberdeen in 1870, sold 1904
HMS Thames 1823 – hulked as convict ship at Deptford in 1841, transferred to Bermuda in 1844, sunk in 1863, wreck subsequently sold for breaking
HMS Fox 1829 – converted to screw propulsion in 1856, broken up 1882
HMS Unicorn 1824 – never fitted for sea, hulked as training ship for the RNR at Dundee in 1860 and still afloat there as museum ship
HMS Daedalus 1826 – cut down to a corvette in 1844, hulked as training ship for the RNR at Bristol in 1861, sold for breaking in 1911
HMS Proserpine 1830 – sold 1864
HMS Mermaid 1825 – hulked as Army powder ship at Purfleet in 1858, returned to the Navy and used as a powder depot at Dublin in 1863, bruken up 1875
HMS Mercury 1826 – hulked as coal depot at Woolwich in 1862, transferred to Sheerness in 1873, sold 1906
HMS Penelope 1829 – converted to paddle frigate in 1843, sold 1864
HMS Thalia 1830 – hulked as Roman Catholic chapel ship at Portsmouth in 1855, broken up 1867
[[Cydnus class frigate|Cydnus class]] 38-gun fifth rates, eight pine-built ships (essentially identical to the Leda class, with the exception of a flat stern, necessary for "fir-built" ships), 1813
HMS Cydnus 1813 – broken up 1816
HMS Eurotas 1813 – broken up 1817
HMS Niger 1813 – broken up 1820
HMS Meander 1813 – broken up 1817
HMS Pactolus 1813 – broken up 1818
HMS Tiber 1813 – broken up 1820
HMS Araxes 1813 – broken up 1817
HMS Tanais 1813 – broken up 1819
HMS Nemesis – altered to Seringapatam class
HMS Statira – altered to Seringapatam class
HMS Jason – altered to Seringapatam class
HMS Druid – altered to Seringapatam class
HMS Pegasus – cancelled 1831
[[Penelope-class frigate|Penelope class]] 36-gun fifth rates 1798–1800, designed by John Henslow
HMS Penelope 1798 – troopship in 1814, wrecked in the Saint Lawrence River in 1815
HMS Amethyst 1799 – wrecked and subsequently broken up 1811
HMS Jason 1800 – wrecked in 1801
HMS Lavinia 44-gun fifth rate 1806, designed by Jean-Louis Barrallier – hulked as lazaretto in Liverpool in 1836, coal depot at Plymouth in 1852, sunk in Plymouth Sound after collision with HAPAG Ship Cimbria
[[Amphion-class frigate|Amphion class]] 32-gun fifth rates 1798–1809, designed by William Rule.
HMS Amphion 1798 – breakwater 1820
HMS Aeolus 1801 – broken up 1817
HMS Medusa 1801 – hulked as hospital ship at Plymouth in 1813, broken up 1816
HMS Proserpine 1807 – taken by the French Pénélope and Pauline off Toulon on 28 February 1809
HMS Nereus 1809 – broken up 1817
[[Narcissus class frigate|Narcissus class]] 32-gun fifth rates 1801–1808, designed by John Henslow
HMS Narcissus 1801 – hulked as convict ship at Woolwich in 1823, sold 1837
HMS Tartar 1801 – wrecked in the Baltic Sea on 18 August 1811
HMS Cornelia 1808 – broken up 1814
HMS Siren – cancelled 1806
HMS Doris – cancelled 1806
[[Apollo class frigate|Apollo class]], 27 ships, 36-gun fifth rates 1799–1819, designed by William Rule
HMS Apollo 1799 – wrecked near Cabo Mondego (Portugal) in April 1804
HMS Blanche 1800 – taken by the French 40-gun 18-pounder Frigate Topaze in July 1805
HMS Euryalus 1803 – paid off in March 1825
HMS Semiramis 1808 – guardship at Portsmouth in 1821, cut down to 24-gun corvette in 1827, broken up in November 1844
HMS Owen Glendower 1808 – convict ship at Gibraltar in October 1842, receiving ship athere in 1880, sold in 1884
HMS Curacoa 1809 – cut down to 24-gun corvette in 1831, broken up in March 1849
HMS Saldanha 1809 – wrecked and sank with all hands off Lough Swilly on 4 December 1811
HMS Malacca 1809 – paid off in June 1815, broken up in March 1816
HMS Orpheus 1809 – laid up at Chatham in September 1816, broken up in August 1819
HMS Theban 1809 – broken up in May 1817
HMS Leda 1809 – sold in April 1817
HMS Manilla 1809 – wrecked on the Haak Sands off the Texel at Callantsoog on 28 January 1812
HMS Belvidera 1809 – store depot at Portsmouth in 1846, receiving ship in 1852, sold in July 1906
HMS Hotspur 1810 – in ordinary at Portsmouth in November 1815, broken up in January 1821
HMS Astraea 1810 – broken up in 1851
HMS Galatea 1810 – receiving ship and coal depot on Jamaica in 1839, broken up in 1849
HMS Havannah 1811 – cut down to 24-gun corvette in 1845, training ship at Cardiff, sold for breaking in 1905
HMS Maidstone 1811 – receiving ship at Portsmouth in August 1832, coal depot there in 1838, broken up in January 1867
HMS Stag 1812 – laid up at Plymouth in November 1814, broken up in September 1821
HMS Magicienne 1812 – broken up in March 1845
HMS Barrosa 1812 – laid up in September 1815, receiving ship and ordnance depot at Portsmouth in 1823, sold in 1841
HMS Dartmouth 1813 – paid off in March 1830, broken up in November 1854
HMS Creole 1813 – harbour service at Chatham in 1833, broken up in August of the same year
HMS Tartar 1814 – receiving ship at Sheerness in March 1830, broken up in September 1859
HMS Brilliant 1814 – training ship in 1860, renamed Briton in 1889, sold for breaking in 1908
HMS Pallas 1816 – coal depot at Plymouth in November 1836, sold in January 1862
HMS Blonde 1819 – completed to a new 46-gun design
[[Aigle class frigate|Aigle class]] 36-gun fifth rates, 1801, designed by John Henslow
HMS Aigle 1801
HMS Resistance 1801
HMS Ethalion 36-gun fifth rate 1802
[[Lively class frigate|Lively class]] 38-gun fifth rates 1804–13, designed by William Rule
HMS Lively 1804
HMS Resistance 1805
HMS Apollo 1805
HMS Hussar 1807
HMS Statira 1807
HMS Horatio 1807
HMS Spartan 1806
HMS Undaunted 1807
HMS Menelaus 1810
HMS Nisus 1810
HMS Macedonian 1810
HMS Crescent 1810
HMS Bacchante 1811
HMS Nymphe 1812
HMS Sirius 1813
HMS Laurel 1813
HMS Forte 38-gun fifth rate 1814, built to the Lines of the French Révolutionnaire, captured in 1794 – broken up 1844
[[Perseverance-class frigate|Perseverance class]] 36-gun fifth rates 1803–11 (a revival of the class of 1781–83 – see above)
HMS Tribune 1803 – cut down to a 24-gun corvette in 1833, lost near Tarragona on 28 November 1839
HMS Shannon 1803 – run ashore near La Hogue and burnt to avoid capture on 10 December 1803
HMS Meleager 1806 – wrecked on Bare Bush Key east of Jamaica on 30 July 1808
HMS Iphigenia 1806 – presented to the Marine Society as training ship in 1833, broken up 1851
HMS Orlando 1811 – hulked as hospital ship at Trincomalee in 1819, sold 1824
HMS Lowestoffe – cancelled 1805
teak-built Perseverance class – same as above but built from teak wood in Bombay dockyard
HMS Salsette 1805 – hulked as lazaretto at Pembroke in 1831, receiving ship at Woolwich in 1835, broken up 1874
HMS Doris 1807 – sold at Valparaiso 1829
HMS Hyperion 32-gun fifth rate 1807, designed by John Henslow on the basis of the French Magicienne of 1778
HMS Bucephalus 32-gun fifth rate 1808, designed by William Rule
HMS Pyramus 36-gun fifth rate 1810, built to the lines of the French Belle Poule of 1765
Purchased ships of 1804–05 (all teak-built in India)
HMS Sir Edward Hughes 1804
HMS Duncan 1805
HMS Howe 1805
[[Scamander class frigate|Scamander class]] 36-gun fifth rates, 10 pine-built ships, 1813–14
HMS Eridanus 1813
HMS Orontes 1813
HMS Scamander 1813
HMS Tagus 1813
HMS Ister 1813
HMS Tigris 1813
HMS Euphrates 1813
HMS Hebrus 1813
HMS Granicus 1813
HMS Alpheus 1814
[[Seringapatam class frigate|Seringapatam class]] 46-gun fifth rates, 1819–40
HMS Seringapatam 1819
HMS Madagascar 1822
HMS Druid 1825
HMS Nemesis 1826
HMS Africaine 1827
HMS Leda 1828
HMS Hotspur 1828
HMS Eurotas 1829
HMS Andromeda 1829
HMS Seahorse 1830
HMS Stag 1830
HMS Forth 1833
HMS Maeander 1840
HMS Euphrates – cancelled 1831
HMS Orpheus – cancelled 1831
HMS Severn – cancelled 1831
HMS Tiber – cancelled 1831
HMS Manilla – cancelled 1831
HMS Spartan – cancelled 1831
HMS Theban – cancelled 1831
HMS Jason – cancelled 1831
HMS Statira – cancelled 1832
HMS Tigris – cancelled 1832
HMS Inconstant – cancelled 1832
HMS Pique – cancelled 1832

24-pounder armed frigates
1794 razees 44-gun (converted from 64-gun ships of the line in 1794)
HMS Indefatigable converted 1794
HMS Anson converted 1794
HMS Magnanime converted 1794
HMS Endymion 40 guns 1797; later classed as 50-gun frigate; built to the lines of the French Pomone of 1785 (captured 1794) – broken up 1868
[[Endymion class frigate|Endymion class]] 40-gun (later classed as 50-gun) "fir-built" (actually pitch pine-built) fifth rates 1813–14
HMS Severn 1813 – sold 1825
HMS Liffey 1813 – broken up 1827
HMS Liverpool 1814 – sold 1822
HMS Glasgow 1814 – broken up 1828
HMS Forth 1814 – broken up 1819
HMS Cambrian 40-gun fifth rate 1797; designed by John Henslow – wrecked in the Mediterranean 1828
HMS Leander 50-gun (later 60-gun) fourth rate 1813; designed by William Rule – broken up 1830
HMS Newcastle 50-gun (later 60-gun) fourth rate 1813; design by Jean-Louis Barrallier – hulked 1824, no records after 1827
HMS Isis 58-gun fourth rate 1819; designed by William Rule – hulked 1861, sold 1867
HMS Java 50-gun fourth rate 1815; designed by the "Surveyors of the Navy" – hulked 1861, broken up 1862
[[Southampton class frigate (1820)|Southampton class]] 58-gun fourth rates 1820–03; modified from the design of the Java above
HMS Southampton 1820 – presented to the Coastguard 1857, sold 1912
HMS Portland 1822 – hulked as floating depot 1846, sold 1862
HMS Lancaster 1823 – hulked as hospital ship 1847, sold 1864
HMS Winchester 1822 – hulked as training ship and renamed Conway 1862, renamed Mount Edgcumbe, sold 1921
HMS Chichester 1843 – hulked and presented to the National Refuge Society, sold 1889
HMS Worcester 1843 – hulked as training ship 1862, sold for breaking 1885
HMS Liverpool – cancelled 1829
HMS Jamaica – cancelled 1829
HMS President 52-gun (later 60-gun) fourth rate 1829; built to the lines of the USS President (captured 1814) – hulked as Royal Navy Reserve training ship 1861, renamed Old President and then sold 1903

32-pounder armed frigates
razees 56-gun (converted from 74-gun ships of the line)
HMS Goliath converted 1813
HMS Saturn converted 1813
HMS Majestic converted 1813
HMS Elephant converted 1817–18
HMS Excellent conversion began 1825
HMS Castor 36-gun fifth rate 1832
HMS Vernon 50-gun fourth rate 1832
[[Pique class frigate|Pique class]] 36-gun fifth rates 1834–41
HMS Pique 1834
HMS Cambrian 1841
HMS Flora 1844
HMS Active 1845
HMS Sybille 1847
HMS Constance – re-ordered to different design
HMS Chesapeake – re-ordered as steam/screw frigate
HMS Inconstant 36-gun fifth rate 1836
HMS Thetis 36-gun fifth rate 1846
HMS Nankin 50-gun fourth rate 1850

The following classes were launched as sailing frigates but converted to steam when still active in c. 1860.
Raleigh class 50-gun fourth rates 1845
HMS Raleigh 1845 (wrecked 1857)
HMS Severn (later converted to screw)
[[Constance class frigate|Constance class]] 50-gun fourth rates 1846
HMS Constance 1846 (later converted to screw)
HMS Arethusa 1849 (later converted to screw)
HMS Octavia 1849 (later converted to screw)
HMS Sutlej 1855 (later converted to screw)
HMS Liffey – re-ordered as steam/screw frigate
[[Leander class frigate (1848)|Leander class]] 50-gun fourth rates 1848
HMS Leander 1848 (later converted to screw)
HMS Shannon – re-ordered as steam/screw frigate
HMS Phaeton 50-gun fourth rate 1848 (later converted to screw)
[[Indefatigable class frigate|Indefatigable class]] 50-gun fourth rates 1848
HMS Indefatigable 1848 (retired 1857, later a training ship)
HMS Phoebe 1854 (later converted to screw)
The following three classes were begun as sailing frigates, but all were completed as screw-driven steam frigates.
[[Emerald class frigate|Emerald class]] 50-gun fourth rates, ordered 1848.
[[San Fiorenzo class frigate|San Fiorenzo class]] 50-gun fourth rates, ordered 1848.
[[Narcissus class frigate|Narcissus class]] 50-gun fourth rates, ordered 1848.

19th century steam frigates
During the 1840s, the introduction of steam propulsion was to radically change the nature of the frigate. Initial trials were with paddle-driven vessels, but these had numerous disadvantages, not least that the paddle wheels restricted the numbers of guns that could be mounted on the broadside.  So the application of the screw propeller meant that a full broadside could still be carried, and a number of sail frigates were adapted, while during the 1850s the first frigates designed from the start to have screw propulsion were ordered. It is important to remember that all these early steam vessels still carried a full rig of masts and sails, and that steam power remained a means of assistance to these vessels.

In 1887 all frigates and corvettes in the British Navy were re-categorised as 'cruisers', and the term 'frigate' was abolished, not to re-emerge until the Second World War, at which time it was resurrected to describe a totally different type of escort vessel.

Paddle-driven frigates

Although iron hulls were used for some warships in the 1840s, almost all the paddle frigates were wooden-hulled. The exception was the ill-fated Birkenhead.
  1839–44 – second class, originally classed just as 'steam vessels', lengthened versions of sloop Gorgon
  1839
  1843
  1842
  1844
  1844 – second class, originally classed just as a 'steam vessel', lengthened version of Cyclops with modified hull
  1845 – second class, originally classed just as 'steam vessels', lengthened version of Firebrand
  1845
  1845
  1843 – first class, originally built as a sailing frigate in 1829
  1844 – first class, originally classed just as a 'steam vessel', modified version of Cyclops
  1845 – first class, originally classed just as a 'steam vessel'
  1845 – first class
  (ex-Vulcan) iron-hulled frigate 1845 – second class, launched as a frigate but completed as a troopship in 1847
  1846 – first class
  1846 – first class, improved version of Odin
  1850 – second class, lengthened version of Odin
  1849 – second class, enlarged version of sloop Sphinx
  1849 – second class, enlarged version of sloop Sphinx
  1849
  1851
 ''' 1850 – second class, enlarged version of sloop Sphinx  1850
 HMS Resolute – cancelled 1850

Screw-driven frigates
In the mid-1840s, the Admiralty ordered four iron-hulled, screw-driven frigates from specialist shipbuilders; however, the Admiralty then rapidly lost faith in the ability of iron hulls to stand up to combat conditions, and all four (Greenock, Vulcan, Megaera and Simoom) were converted while under construction into troop transports, although the Greenock was promptly sold for commercial use.

Following this unsuccessful experiment, though iron hulls were used for some warships in the 1840s, almost all the screw frigates below were wooden-hulled. The exceptions were the final three below – Inconstant, Shah and Raleigh – which had iron hulls.
HMS Amphion 1846 – the prototype screw frigate
HMS Arrogant 1848 – first class
[[Dauntless-class frigate|Dauntless class''']] 1847 – second class
HMS Dauntless 1847
HMS Vigilant – cancelled 1849
[[Termagant-class frigate|'Termagant class]] 1847 – second class
HMS Termagant 1847
HMS Euphrates – cancelled 1849
Tribune class 1853 – second class
HMS Tribune 1853
HMS Curacoa 1854
Imperieuse class 1852
HMS Imperieuse 1852
HMS Euryalus 1853
HMS Aurora 1861
HMS Forte 1858
HMS Chesapeake 1855
Liffey class 1856
HMS Liffey 1856
HMS Shannon 1855
HMS Topaze 1858
HMS Bacchante 1859
HMS Liverpool 1860
Diadem class 1856–57
HMS Diadem 1856
HMS Doris 1857
Ariadne class 1859
HMS Ariadne 1859
HMS Galatea 1859
Emerald class 1856
HMS Emerald 1856
HMS Melpomene 1857
HMS Immortalite 1859
Mersey class 1858
HMS Orlando 1858
HMS Mersey 1858
HMS Narcissus 1859
Bristol class 1860
HMS Newcastle 1860
HMS Glasgow 1861
HMS Bristol 1861
HMS Undaunted 1861
 Ten further vessels to this design were cancelled in 1863–64 – Tweed, Dryad, Belvidera, Pomone, Raleigh, Briton, Barham, Boadicea, Bucephalus and Dextrous.
[[Ister-class frigate|Ister class']] 1865
HMS Endymion 1865
 Four further vessels to this design were cancelled in 1863–64 – Ister, Blonde, Astrea and Dartmouth.
HMS Inconstant iron-hulled frigate 1868
HMS Shah iron-hulled frigate 1873
HMS Raleigh iron-hulled frigate 1873

Modern frigates – by class

The term 'frigate' was revived during World War II for a new type of escort vessel and has been employed continuously since that period. Note that, unlike the previous sections, no lists of the individual ships comprising each class are shown below the class names; the individual vessels are to be found in the articles on the separate classes.
 River class – 138 ships, 1941–1944
 Colony class – 21 ships
 Captain class – 78 ships
 Loch class – 26 ships
 Bay class – 21 ships (redesigned Loch class for anti-aircraft escort)
 Type 15 – 23 ships (full rebuilds of World War II destroyer hulls)
 Type 16 – 10 ships (partial rebuilds of wartime destroyer hulls)
 Type 41 Leopard class – 4 ships
 Type 61 Salisbury class – 4 ships
 Type 12 Whitby class – 6 ships
 Type 12M Rothesay class – 9 ships
 Type 12I Leander class – 26 ships (subclasses: 8 Batch 1, 8 Batch 2, 10 Batch 3)
 Type 14 Blackwood class – 12 ships
 Type 81 Tribal class – 7 ships
 Type 21 Amazon class – 8 ships 
 Type 22 – 14 ships (subclasses: Broadsword 4, Boxer 6, Cornwall 4)
 Type 23 Duke class – 16 ships 
 Type 26 City class – 3 ordered, 8 ships planned
 Type 31 frigate – 5 ships planned
 Type 32 frigate – 5 ships planned

Reference sources
Robert Gardiner, The First Frigates (Conway Maritime, 1992); The Heavy Frigate (Conway Maritime, 1994); Warships of the Napoleonic Era (Chatham Publishing, 1999); Frigates of the Napoleonic Wars (Chatham Publishing, 2000)
Rif Winfield, The Sail and Steam Navy List, 1815–1889 (co-author David Lyon, Chatham Publishing, 2004) ;British Warships in the Age of Sail: 1793–1817 (2nd edition, Seaforth Publishing, 2008) ;British Warships in the Age of Sail: 1714–1792 (Seaforth Publishing, 2007) ;British Warships in the Age of Sail: 1603–1714'' (Seaforth Publishing, 2009) .

See also
Type system of the Royal Navy
Bibliography of 18th-19th century Royal Naval history

References

Frigates
Royal Navy
 
Frigate classes